George Robertson (20 April 1930 – 23 March 2003) was a Scottish footballer who played as a defender.

Born in Falkirk, Robertson began his career with Junior club Gairdoch Juniors. He signed for Plymouth Argyle after he played in a trial match while based in Salisbury with the RAF. He made his first team debut in 1951 and was a regular in the side for the next decade, initially as a centre back and then as a full back; his favoured position. Towards the end of his career he joined Falmouth Town as player-manager.

Robertson then returned to Plymouth to become a groundsman at Plymouth College, and then as a member of the staff at Home Park. He ran the club's youth hostel, before being appointed as groundsman in the 1980s. In later life, Robertson became a milkman. 

Robertson died in Plymouth on 23 March 2003, at the age of 72.

References

1930 births
2003 deaths
Footballers from Falkirk
Scottish footballers
Association football defenders
Plymouth Argyle F.C. players
English Football League players
Falmouth Town A.F.C. players